This is a list of transfers in Dutch football for the 2008 Summer transfer window. Only moves featuring Eredivisie side professional players are listed.

The summer transfer window opened on July 1, 2008, and closed on September 1. Deals may be signed at any given moment in the season, but the actual transfer may only take place during the transfer window.

Player transfers

ADO Den Haag

In:

Out:

Ajax

In:

Out:

AZ Alkmaar

In:

Out:

Feyenoord

In:

Out:

De Graafschap

In:

    

Out:

FC Groningen

In:

Out:

SC Heerenveen

In:

Out:

Heracles Almelo

In:

Out:

NAC Breda

In:

Out:

NEC Nijmegen

In:

 

Out:

PSV Eindhoven

In:

Out:

Roda JC

In:

Out:

Sparta Rotterdam

In:

Out:

FC Twente

In:

Out:

FC Utrecht

In:

Out:

Vitesse Arnhem

In:

Out:

FC Volendam

In:

Out:

Willem II Tilburg

In:

Out:

Manager transfers

See also
 Football in the Netherlands
 List of English football transfers Summer 2008
 List of Belgian football transfers Summer 2008
 List of Spanish football transfers Summer 2008
 Transfer window

References

Dutch
2008
Transfers